Jerry Ray Norton (May 16, 1931 – January 14, 2020) was a professional American football safety and punter in the National Football League (NFL) for the Philadelphia Eagles, Chicago/St. Louis Cardinals, Dallas Cowboys and Green Bay Packers.  He was selected to five Pro Bowls. He played college football at Southern Methodist University.

Early years
Norton attended Texas High School in Texarkana, Texas, where he played football and basketball. He was named All-state in both sports. In football, he was a two-way player as a running back and defensive back. As a senior, he was selected to participate in both sports All-star games, but only chose basketball, because it was the invitation that arrived first.

He accepted a scholarship from Southern Methodist University, where he led the team in rushing as a sophomore (438 yards). As a  junior, he led the team in passing and rushing (383 yards). He was also one of the nation's top punters. He played only on offense in 1952.

In 2007, he was inducted into the Texas High School Football Hall of Fame. Jerry Norton died on January 14, 2020, in Dallas, Texas. He was 88 years old.

Professional career

Philadelphia Eagles
Norton was selected in the seventh round (81st overall) of the 1954 NFL Draft. As a rookie, he played safety and finished with 5 interceptions.

In 1955, he played as a running back, registering 36 carries for 144 yards (4.0 average). In 1958, he only played in 9 games after suffering a broken jaw in a loss against the Pittsburgh Steelers. That season, he started to have confrontations with the Eagles front office because of his salary demands, so on September 4, 1959, he was traded to the Chicago Cardinals in exchange for offensive guard Bob Konovsky and defensive end Jerry Wilson.

Chicago / St. Louis Cardinals
Norton was named the Cardinals starting Safety and punter. In 1960, he led the league with 10 interceptions and a 45.6 yards punt average. The next year, he ranked fifth in the NFL with 7 interceptions. He is the only player in league history to twice intercept four passes in a game (1960 and 1961). On November 26, 1961, he returned two interceptions for touchdowns and 109 yards against the Pittsburgh Steelers.

On December 14, 1961, he notified the team of his intentions to retire, but the Dallas Cowboys eventually convinced him to play in his home state.
 
During the 1962 offseason, he was traded to the Cowboys in a three-team deal. The Baltimore Colts sent a third round draft pick (#33-Mike Fracchia) to the Cardinals and the Cowboys sent tight end/placekicker Dick Bielski to the Colts.

Dallas Cowboys
In 1962, he was named the starter at strong safety for the Dallas Cowboys. In week 13 against the St. Louis Cardinals, he returned 94 yards the first attempted field goal for a touchdown in franchise history. On September 10, 1963, he was traded to the Green Bay Packers in exchange for a sixth round draft choice (#83-Jim Evans).

Green Bay Packers
Norton spent his last two years with the Green Bay Packers, where he was only used as a punter.

References

1931 births
2020 deaths
People from Gilmer, Texas
People from Texarkana, Texas
Players of American football from Texas
American football safeties
American football punters
SMU Mustangs football players
Philadelphia Eagles players
Chicago Cardinals players
St. Louis Cardinals (football) players
Dallas Cowboys players
Green Bay Packers players
Eastern Conference Pro Bowl players